The 2008–09 Albany Great Danes men's basketball team represented the University at Albany, SUNY during the 2008–09 NCAA Division I men's basketball season. The Great Danes, led by eighth year head coach Will Brown, played their home games at SEFCU Arena as members of the America East Conference. They finished the season 15–16, 6–10 in America East play to finish in seventh place. As the seventh seed in the 2009 America East tournament, they upset second seed Vermont in the first round before losing to sixth seed UMBC in the semifinals.

Previous season
The Great Danes finished the 2007–08 season 15–15, 10–6 in America East play to finish in a tie for second place. As the No. 3 seed in the 2008 America East tournament, they were defeated in the quarterfinals by Boston University.

Schedule and results

|-
!colspan=12 style=|Non-conference regular season

|-
!colspan=12 style=| American East regular season

|-
!colspan=12 style=| America East tournament

Albany
Albany Great Danes men's basketball seasons
Albany Great Danes
Albany Great Danes